Calmodulin 1 is a protein that in humans is encoded by the CALM1 gene.

Function 

Calmodulin 1 is the archetype of the family of calcium-modulated (calmodulin) proteins of which nearly 20 members have been found. They are identified by their occurrence in the cytosol or on membranes facing the cytosol and by a high affinity for calcium. Calmodulin contains 148 amino acids and has 4 calcium-binding EF hand motifs. Its functions include roles in growth and the cell cycle as well as in signal transduction and the synthesis and release of neurotransmitters.

Interactions 

Calmodulin 1 has been shown to interact with:
 AKAP9, 
 Androgen receptor, 
 IQGAP1, 
 PPEF1, and
 TRPV1.

References

Further reading

External links 
UniProt entry

EF-hand-containing proteins